Christophe Himmer (born 22 January 1976) is a retired French footballer who played as a midfielder.

External links
 
 Profile at foot-national.com
 

1976 births
Living people
Association football midfielders
French footballers
Stade Rennais F.C. players
Nimes Olympique players
Tours FC players
Levallois SC players
FC Sète 34 players